The Yinqueshan Han Slips are ancient Chinese writing tablets from the Western Han dynasty, made of bamboo strips and discovered in 1972. The tablets contain many writings that were not previously known or shed new light on the ancient versions of classic texts.

The Yinqueshan Han Tombs were accidentally unearthed by construction workers on April 10, 1972. Archaeologists arrived a few days later to excavate the site. The bamboo slips were discovered in Tombs no. 1 and  2 at the foot of Yinqueshan, located southeast of the city of Linyi in the province of Shandong. Discovered in Tomb no. 1 were 4942 bamboo strips covered in closely written words and included portions of known texts, as well as a number of previously unknown military and divination texts, some of which were shown to resemble chapters in Guanzi and Mozi. The occupant had been identified as a military officer bearing the surname Sima.

Tomb no. 2, unearthed the same year, contained 32 strips of bamboo writings which clearly represent sections of a calendar for the year 134 BC.

The time of burial for both tombs had been dated to about 140 BC/134 BC and 118 BC, the texts having been written on the bamboo slips before then. After restoration and arrangement, the slips were organised into a sequential order of nine groups and 154 sections. The first group included 13 fragment chapters from Sunzi's The Art of War, and 5 undetermined chapters; the second group were the 16 chapters of Sun Bin's Art of War, which had been missing for at least 1,400 years; the third included the 7 original and lost chapters from the Six Strategies (before this significant find only the titles of the lost chapters were known); the fourth and fifth included 5 chapters from the Weiliaozi and 16 chapters from the Yanzi chunqiu; the rest of the groups included anonymous writings.

The slips are kept in the Yinqueshan Han Tombs Bamboo Slips Museum and in the Shandong Provincial Museum.

Contents 

More than 38% of slips (1887 out of total 4942) were heavily damaged, which made the texts' reconstruction a very difficult task. Preliminarily, apart of the most famous texts of Yinqueshan, some 80 more were identified.

See also 
 Guodian Chu Slips
 Mawangdui Silk Texts
 Shuanggudui
 Shuihudi Qin bamboo texts
 Zhangjiashan Han bamboo texts

References

Citations

Sources

External links 
 《銀雀山漢墓竹簡》 at the Chinese Text Project

Bamboo and wooden slips
Archaeological artifacts of China
Han dynasty texts
Linyi
1972 archaeological discoveries